Elisabeth Jane Tooker (August 2, 1927January 13, 2005) was an American anthropologist.

Elisabeth Jane Tooker was born on August 2, 1927, in Brooklyn, New York, to Amy (Luce) and Clyde Tooker. She received a bachelor's and doctorate from Radcliffe College in 1949 and 1958, respectively, and a master's from the University of Arizona in 1953. Her PhD dissertation was titled Ritual, Power and the Supernatural: A Comparative Study of Indian Religions in Southwestern United States. Tooker taught at the University at Buffalo, Mount Holyoke College, and Temple University, where she spent most of her career.

Tooker's research focused on the Haudenosaunee (Iroquois). She did field research with Seneca people in Tonawanda, New York, and published on topics including Iroquois religion.

Tooker died on January 13, 2005, in Philadelphia, Pennsylvania.

Books  

 An Ethnography of the Huron Indians, 1615–1649 (1964)
 The Iroquois Ceremonial of Midwinter (1970)
 The Indians of the Northeast: A Critical Bibliography (1978)
 Native North American Spirituality of the Eastern Woodlands: Sacred Myths, Dreams, Visions, Speeches, Healing Formulas, Rituals and Ceremonials (1979)
 Lewis H. Morgan on Iroquois Material Culture (1994)

References 

1927 births
2005 deaths
Radcliffe College alumni
American women anthropologists
Mount Holyoke College faculty
Temple University faculty
University at Buffalo faculty
University of Arizona alumni